The ZBD-04 or Type 04 (industrial designation WZ502) is a Chinese infantry fighting vehicle. It bears some external resemblance to the BMP-3, particularly with regards to its turret and main armament; However, the chassis and internal subsystem possesses a different layout. The earliest prototypes received the designation ZBD-97. An improved version, ZBD-04A, is the vehicle currently in service and being produced.

Development

The ZBD-97/ZBD-04 was designed as the successor to the ZBD-86 and has been in service with the People's Liberation Army ground forces since 1999, in the armored units of the Guangzhou and Nanjing military regions. Besides the infantry fighting vehicle (IFV) variant, an armored recovery vehicle (ARV) variant is also available. A further improved variant is known as the ZBD-04A.

In 1996, China imported the technologies of BMP-3 turret and weapon systems with licenses from Russia. After testing, the Chinese military decided to fit the imported weapon systems with indigenously-developed turret and chassis. The night vision system with IR searchlight of the BMP-3 was deemed outdated and was replaced by a day/night thermal sight. Laser warning receivers and meteorological sensor systems were installed. ZBD-04 features a fully welded turret and frontal engine compartment for more effective troop dismount operation, whereas BMP-3 has the engine situated at the rear.

The first prototype appeared in 1997, hence the designation ZBD-97.

Design
The ZBD-04 has a crew of three (a commander, a driver, and a gunner) and can carry seven troops. The commander and gunner are seated in the two-man turret located in the middle, and the driver with one passenger is located in tandem to the left of the power compartment, located at the front right. Six infantrymen are located in the troop compartment at the rear.

There are firing ports on the left, right, and exit door that allows infantrymen to fire assault rifles or light machine guns from inside the vehicle, even on the move. The vehicle is amphibious, featuring two water jets.

Armament

The main armament of the ZBD-04 is a two-plane stabilized, semi-automatic 100 mm rifled gun, capable of firing both HE-FRAG rounds and the 3UBK10 ATGM. The effective range of the HE-FRAG round is estimated to be 4,000 meters, with a rate of fire of 10 rounds/minute. The 3UBK10 ATGM and its Chinese derivate consist of a laser beam riding missile and a container case. As well as engaging armored vehicles and fortifications, the missile could also engage low-flying helicopters. The missile has a maximum range of 4,000 m and can penetrate 600 mm of armor. 

Chinese engineers developed programmable airburst HE-FRAG, bunker-buster, and thermobaric shells for the rifled gun, The Chinese 3UBK10 derivate was also upgraded on the ZBD-04A with top-attack capability supported by the millimeter-wave fire-control radar mounted above the rifled gun. The system can store 30 rounds of 100 mm missiles or other cartridges inside the turret.

The ZBD-04 also has a coaxial ZPT-99 30 mm automatic cannon, with 500 rounds. The cannon can fire both armor-piercing (AP) and HE-FRAG rounds. It is also fitted with indigenously-developed 30 mm armor-piercing discarding sabot (APDS) and armor-piercing fin-stabilized discarding sabot (APFSDS) rounds. The rate of fire is 300 rounds/min and the range is 1,500 to 2,000 m. The ZBD-04 also has a Type 86 7.62 mm coaxial machine gun located to the left of the main gun. The coaxial machine gun was replaced by QJT-88 5.8 mm on the ZBD-04A. Certain variant of the ZBD-04 can be equipped with four HJ-8 wire-guided anti-tank missiles on both sides of the turret.

On ZBD-04A, the main armament layout is kept largely the same, whilst the electronics and protections are upgraded.

Electronics
On ZBD-04, the gunner has an integrated day/night thermal scope and an emergency backup day sight. Fire-control system includes a digital ballistic computer, an electro-mechanical gun stabilizer, and a laser rangefinder. The driver’s hatch mounts three periscopes, with the central periscope being able to be replaced by an image intensifying night vision periscope. On the original ZBD-04, The commander has a combined daylight/thermal periscope and a back-up day sight.

On the ZBD-04A, the vehicle receives an improved thermal system, while the commander has been upgraded to an independent thermal sight that can rotate 360 degrees. The digital fire control system supports "hunter-killer" and commander takeover, automatic target tracking, battle management system, and laser designator functions. A millimeter-wave fire-control radar was mounted above the rifled gun to support target acquisition and missile guidance.

Protection
The ZBD-04 is fitted with a collective NBC protection system, with its air filter located behind the turret to the right. There is a three-barrel smoke grenade launcher mounted on either side of the turret. The vehicle is fitted with an indigenous-made laser warning and countermeasures system.

While ballistic protection is unknown, the vehicle likely has all-round protection against 14.5 mm rounds and resistance against 20–25 mm shells over the frontal arc. On the ZBD-04A, the protection is further improved with appliqué armor plates, with a claimed protection level of defending 30 mm round in the front. Two additional smoke discharges are mounted on each side of the turret, for a total of 10.

Mobility
ZBD-04 is powered by the modified Type 6V150 diesel engine, developing . ZBD-04A reportedly has an engine developing 670 hp. The vehicle is fitted with CH600 hydraulic torque converter.

The ZBD-04 has amphibious capability, designed to swim to shore from a ship. For high-speed swimming, it has two large water jet ports. The ZBD-04A removed water jets to save weight in exchange for better protection, thus no longer capable of operating in the open sea.

Variants

Domestic
ZBD-97 Designation for ZBD-04 prototype. 
ZBD-04 Standard variant.
ZBD-04 HJ-8 Based on the original ZBD-04 with four additional HJ-8 anti-tank missiles mounted on the turret.
ZBD-04A The ZBD-04A (industrial designation WZ502G, sometimes referred to as ZBD-08) is an improved variant that sacrifices amphibious performance for better armor protection; add-on armor can be fitted, and the frontal arc can withstand 30 mm rounds along with side skirts added. Although the vehicle is still amphibious, able to propel itself by its tracks to ford lakes and rivers, it lacks waterjets and can no longer operate in open sea.
ZBD-04A AT (AFT-10 Anti-Tank Missile Carrier) ZBD-04A's chassis works as the mobile launching platform for AFT-10 (HJ-10) anti-tank missiles. Noted the AFT-10 is a specific version of the HJ-10 missile that is designed for firing from vehicle launching platforms such as ZBD-04A. The sensors include a thermal camera, TV camera, and a laser range finder. A millimeter-wave radar system is mounted at the front-right corner of the vehicle to improve all-weather operation capability.
ZBD-04A Command Vehicle Modified from the original ZBD-04A, featuring a crew cabin with a higher ceiling.
ZBD-04A Combat Reconnaissance Vehicle Equipped with radars and electric-optic sights for battlefield surveillance, the chassis of the Combat Reconnaissance Vehicle is modified from standard ZBD-04A. The recon equipment is mounted on a retractable mast.
ZBD-04A Armored Recovery Vehicle Equipped with a crane for emergency vehicle service. 
PLZ-07 122 mm self-propelled howitzer based on the ZBD-04 chassis.

Export
VN11 Export version of the ZBD-04.
VN11A Export version of the ZBD-04A.
VN12 Export variant based on ZBD-04A.

Operators

 People's Liberation Army Ground Force – 2,950+ units as of 2021. 400 units of ZBD-04; 450 units of ZBD-04 HJ-8 Carrier; 1,900 units of ZBD-04A; 200 units of ZBD-04A HJ-10 Carrier; Uncounted units of other variants.

Gallery

See also 
 List of modern armored fighting vehicles
Related development
 ZSD-89A - armored personnel carrier chassis complementing the ZBD-04 series.
 ZBD-03 – airborne combat vehicle developed by China
 ZBD-05 – amphibious fighting vehicle developed by China
 ZBL-08 – wheeled infantry fighting vehicle developed by China
Similar ground systems
 ASCOD
 M2 Bradley
 BMP-3
 CV90
 Warrior
 Type 89
 K21
 Makran IFV
 Puma IFV
 Hunter AFV

References

External links
 
 Sino Defence
 Army Recognition
 Weapon Systems

Tracked infantry fighting vehicles
Amphibious infantry fighting vehicles
Armoured fighting vehicles of the People's Republic of China
Military vehicles introduced in the 1990s